Marco Pinato (born 9 January 1995) is an Italian footballer who plays as a defender for  club Pordenone.

Club career
On 20 August 2014 he was signed by Lanciano in a temporary deal. On 10 July 2015 he was signed by Vicenza. On 31 August 2016 he moved to Latina in a definitive deal.

On 5 July 2017 Pinato was signed by Venezia.

On 16 August 2018, Pianto signed to Serie A club Sassuolo on the condition that he remained at Venezia until the end of the season.

On 30 July 2019, Pinato joined Serie B side Pisa on loan until 30 June 2020.

On 3 September 2020 he moved to Cremonese on loan.

On 31 August 2021, he was loaned to Pordenone. On 31 January 2022, Pinato moved on a new loan to SPAL.

On 1 September 2022, Pinato returned to Pordenone on a permanent basis and signed a three-year contract.

References

External links
 

1995 births
Sportspeople from Monza
Living people
Italian footballers
Italy youth international footballers
A.C. Milan players
S.S. Virtus Lanciano 1924 players
L.R. Vicenza players
Latina Calcio 1932 players
Venezia F.C. players
U.S. Sassuolo Calcio players
Pisa S.C. players
U.S. Cremonese players
Pordenone Calcio players
S.P.A.L. players
Serie B players
Association football defenders
Footballers from Lombardy